Chlanidophora patagiata is a moth of the family Noctuidae first described by Carlos Berg in 1877. It is found in Patagonia; it was historically misclassified, but in 2010 was determined to belong to the subfamily Agaristinae.

References

Agaristinae
Taxa named by Carlos Berg